T. asiaticus may refer to:
 Teilhardina asiaticus, a prehistoric mammal species in the genus Teilhardina
 Tibellus asiaticus, a spider species in the genus Tibellus
 Trollius asiaticus, a plant species
 Typhlodromips asiaticus, a mite species in the genus Typhlodromis

See also
 Asiaticus (disambiguation)